"Requiem" is British Europop duo London Boys' first hit single, released on 28 November 1988 from their debut album, The Twelve Commandments of Dance (1989). The single was written and produced by Ralf René Maué. The single peaked at  4 in the United Kingdom, No. 8 in Ireland, and No. 11 in Austria.

Track listings
7-inch single
A. "Requiem" (Hamburg Edit)
B. "The Midi Dance"

UK 12-inch single
A1. "Requiem" (Hamburg Mix)
B1. "Requiem" (Hamburg Edit)
B2. "The Midi Dance"

German mini-CD single 1
 "Requiem" (Special UK-Mix) – 8:05
 "My Love" – 3:05
 "Dance Dance Dance" – 3:54

German mini-CD single 2
 "Requiem" (Hamburg Edit) – 4:12
 "Requiem" (London Remix) – 8:04
 "Requiem" (Hamburg Mix) – 7:34

Charts

Weekly charts

Year-end charts

Certifications

References

1988 songs
London Boys songs
Songs written by Ralf René Maué
1988 singles
Warner Music Group singles
Atlantic Records singles
Teldec singles